Frank Cyril Tiarks OBE (also known as F. C. Tiarks) (9 July 1874 – 7 April 1952) was an English banker.

Family 
He was son of Henry Frederick Tiarks (23 December 1832 - 18 October 1911), banker, partner in J. Henry Schröder & Co. in London, and wife Agnes Morris (1840 - 5 February 1923), adopted daughter of Alexander Schlüsser, partner in J. Henry Schröder & Co. in London, paternal grandson of Johann Gerhard Tiarks, chaplain of the Duchess of Kent.

Biography 
Educated on HMS Britannia 1887–1889, and served as midshipman in the Royal Navy 1889–1894. Resigned his commission following the death of his elder brother, to join his father in business. Among his appointments were a directorship of the Bank of England (1912–1945); a partnership in J. Henry Schröder & Co.; a partnership in the Anglo-Iranian Oil Company (1917–1948); and High Sheriff of Kent for 1927. He was created an Officer of the Most Excellent Order of the British Empire.

He served in World War I under Sir William Reginald Hall, Director of Naval Intelligence, in Room 40 Admiralty, as Lieut.-Cmdr.

Of German descent himself, like his wife, he was also listed as a member of the Anglo-German Fellowship, of the British Union of Fascists and in Hitler's 'Black Book'.

Marriage and issue 
Tiarks married in Hamburg, Germany, on 18 November 1899 Emmie "Emmy" Marie Franziska Brödermann (15 February 1875 – 27 July 1943), daughter of Eduard Matthias Brödermann, merchant, and wife Ramona Luisa Clara Ignacia Störzel.

His granddaughter, Henrietta Tiarks, The Dowager Duchess of Bedford, is the widow of the fourteenth Duke of Bedford. He is also first cousin third removed of Mark Phillips.

References

 "The Forgotten Banker", 
 Nicholas Mander, "Queen of Seven Swords", Owlpen Press, 2013,  gives a biography with references.
 "Burke's Peerage and Baronetage"

1874 births
1952 deaths
English bankers
Anglo-Persian Oil Company
Officers of the Order of the British Empire
BP people
High Sheriffs of Kent
Royal Navy officers
British Union of Fascists politicians
English fascists